Television networks in Uzbekistan can be divided into three categories:
 National Television and Radio Company of Uzbekistan (MTRK) networks
 Regional television networks of NTRC 
 Private television networks

Table of broadcast networks
All of the networks listed below operate a number of terrestrial television stations. In addition, several of these networks are also aired on cable and satellite services.

Closed networks

See also
 Television in Uzbekistan
 Lists of television channels

References

Lists of television channels by region

Uzbekistan